Melocactus paucispinus is a species of cactus. It is endemic to Brazil, where it is known only from Bahia. Its populations are scattered in sand and gravel substrates.

References

Endemic flora of Brazil
paucispinus
Taxonomy articles created by Polbot